The National Youth Council of Ireland (NYCI) is a representative body for Irish youth organisations,  a role that is recognised in the 2001 Youth Work Act. Currently there are 43 national youth organisations who are full member of the NYCI, another 10 organisations have corresponding or observer status.

The member organisations include a wide variety of youth organisations active at a national level and include youth club organisations, Scouting and Guiding or similar uniformed youth organisations, youth wings of political parties, Irish language youth organisations,  and various other single issue and specialist youth groups.

NYCI is a member of the European apex organisation for youth organisations and councils called the European Youth Forum YFJ.

The NYCI publish a newsletter called Clár na nÓg on a monthly basis.

Board
The board consists of a president, vice president, treasurer and 15 ordinary board members. They are:

James O'Leary - National Association of Traveller Centres - President
Michelle Carew - National Association for Youth Drama - Vice President
David Owens - An Óige - Treasurer
Patricia McKenna - Macra na Feirme
Elaine Nevin - ECO-Unesco
Mike Randall - Scouting Ireland
Aileen Mulligan - Crosscare - Catholic Youth Care
Denis O'Brien - Foroige
Sean Finan - Macra na Feirme
Paul Gralton - Youth Work Ireland
Gregory Moroney - Ógra Fianna Fáil
Mary T Hally - Irish Girl Guides
Ian Power  - Spunout
Nicola Toughey - Catholic Guides of Ireland
Dale McDermott - Young Fine Gael

Member Organisations

Organisations in Membership
 AIESEC
 An Óige
 BeLonG To
 Catholic Guides of Ireland
 Catholic Youth Care
 Church of Ireland Youth Department
 Comhchoiste Náisiúnta na gColáistí Samhraidh
 Confederation of Peace Corps
 DYCW - The Methodist Church in Ireland
 EIL - Intercultural Learning
 Environmental Conservation Organisation
 Community Games
 Exchange House
 Feachtas
 Foróige
 Gael Linn
 Girls' Brigade Ireland
 Girls' Friendly Society
 ICTU Youth Committee
 Irish Second-Level Students' Union
 Irish Girl Guides
 Irish Red Cross Youth
 Junior Chamber Ireland
 Labour Youth
 Macra na Feirme
 National Association for Traveller Centres
 National Association for Youth Drama
 National Committee for Diocesan Youth Directors
 National Forum for Local Voluntary Youth Councils
 National Youth Federation
 No Name Clubs
 Ógra Chorcaí
 Ógra Fianna Fáil
 Ógra Shinn Féin
 Ógras
 Order of Malta Cadets
 Pavee Point
 Presbyterian Youth Board
 Scouting Ireland
 SVP Youth Clubs Council
 Union of Students in Ireland
 Voluntary Service International
 YMCA Ireland
 Young Christian Workers
 Young Fine Gael
 YWCA of Ireland

Organisations with Observer Status
 Coiste na nIarchimí
 Muintearas na nOilean
 Young Greens (Ireland)

Organisations with Corresponding Status
 Blakestown and Mountview Youth Inititiative
 Enable Ireland
 Glencree Youth Group
 IntroArt
 Irish Family Planning Association
 Irish Wheelchair Association

External links
NYCI Website

Youth organisations based in Ireland
Youth councils
Seanad nominating bodies